Istanbul Museum of the History of Science and Technology in Islam is located in the former Imperial Stables Building in Gülhane Park. The museum was opened on 25 May 2008 and displays replicas of 9th and 16th century scientific instruments of Muslim scholars. The models were all made at the Institute for the History of Arab-Islamic Sciences of the Johann Wolfgang Goethe University in Frankfurt from descriptions and drawings in contemporary texts - very few original items are present. Many items are "completely imagined", while others are based on drawings of similar-looking devices in manuscripts, but it is unknown if these were ever built, or intended to be built.

Gallery

References

External links 

  Museum website

Museums in Istanbul
Science and technology museums in Turkey
Islamic museums in Turkey
2008 establishments in Turkey
Museums established in 2008
21st-century religious buildings and structures in Turkey